M'bar N'diaye (born 15 June 1983 in Paris) is a French taekwondo athlete.

He represented France at the 2016 Summer Olympics in Rio de Janeiro, in the men's +80 kg.

References

1983 births
Living people
French male taekwondo practitioners
Sportspeople from Paris
Olympic taekwondo practitioners of France
Taekwondo practitioners at the 2016 Summer Olympics
21st-century French people